This is a list of islands of Ontario.

Lake Abitibi
 Black Island
 Kenosha Island
 Mistaken Islands

Albany River 

 Albany Island
 Big Island
 Blackbear Island
 Byrd Island
 Cheepay Island
 Comb Island
 Fafard Island
 Faries Island
 Hat Island
 Hill Island
 Kagami Island
 Kakago Island
 Linklater Island
 Norran Island
 Oldman Island
 Peacock Island
 Robins Island
 Sand Cherry Island
 Stonebasket Island
 Tanti Island
 Willow Island

Balsam Lake
 Grand Island

Big Gull Lake - West End - Little Gull Lake
 Belle Island
 Carlson Island
 Snake Island
 Chimney Island
 Goat Island
 Race Island
 Rifle Island

Big Gull Lake - East End
 Beacon Island
 Bear Boundary Island
 Big Boundary Island
 Boundary Island
 Brothers Island
 Green Island
 Johns Island
 Long Island
 Marshall Island
 Pogue's Island
 Redlac Island
 Sister Island
 Three Sister's Island
 Viking Point Island
 Whalen Island
 Whispering Pines Island

Big Rideau Lake
 Big Island
 Exe Island
 Grindstone Island
 Land's End Island
 Long Island
 Oak Island
 Tar Island
 Turnip Island
 Tower Island

Buckhorn Lake
 Emerald Isle
 Fox Island
 Nichol Island

Cataraqui River
 Isle of Man

Charleston Lake
 Crosier Island

Lake Chemong
 Big Island

Lake Couchiching
 Chiefs Island

Cranberry Lake
 Beaupre Island

Detroit River

 Bois Blanc Island
 Fighting Island
 Peche Island
 Turkey Island

Lake Erie

 Big Chicken Island
 Chick Island
 East Sister Island
 Hen Island
 Middle Island
 Mohawk Island
 North Harbour Island
 Pelee Island
 Ryerson's island

Fairbank Lake
 Fairbank Island

French River

 Cantin Island
 Eighteen Mile Island
 Fourmile Island
 Okikendawt Island
 Potvin Island

Gloucester Pool
 Broadview Island
 Deer Island
 Lauley Island

Grand River
 Kerby Island

Gull Lake
 Long Island

Lake Huron

 Argyle Island
 Beament Island
 Burke Island
 Chantry Island
 Cigar Island
 Cockburn Island
 Cove Island
 Cranberry Island
 Devil Island
 Doctor Island
 Great Duck Island
 Evelyn Island
 Fitzwilliam Island
 Garden Island
 Ghegheto Island
 Greene Island
 Gull Rock
 Herschel Island
 Indian Island
 Jack Island
 Kitchener Island
 Kolfage Island
 Little Kitchener Island
 Lonely Island
 Lucas Island
 Lyal Island
 Main Station Island
 Manitoulin Island
 McCallum Island
 Middle Duck Island
 North Otter Island
 Oar Island
 Outer Duck Island
 Perseverance Island
 Peters Island
 Pine Island
 Russell Island
 Smokehouse Island
 South Otter Island
 St. Joseph Island
 Stevens Island
 Thibault Island
 Turning Island
 Twin Island
 Tyson Island
 Vimy Island
 Western Duck Island
 Whiskey Island
 Whitefish Island
 Yeo Island

Georgian Bay

 Aberdeen Island
 Badgeley Island
 Barrier Island
 Bateau Island
 Bears Rump Island
 Beausoleil Island
 Beckwith Island
 Big Burnt Island
 Bone Island
 Bustard Islands
 Centre Island
 Champlain Island
 Champlain Monument Island
 Christian Island
 Churchill Islands
 Club Island
 Cockburn Island
 Crescent Island
 Dead Island
 Echo Island
 Elizabeth Island
 Elmtree Island
 Foster Island
 Fox Island
 Franklin Island
 French River Island
 Fryingpan Island
 Flowerpot Island
 George Island
 Giants Tomb Island
 Governor Island
 Gray Island
 Griffith Island
 Halfmoon Island
 Hatch Island
 Hay Island
 Heisey Islands
 Hen and Chicken Island
 Hertzberg Island
 Hope Island
 Huckleberry Island
 Kelvin Island
 King's Island
 Kokanongwi Island
 Lonely Island
 Lookout Island
 Loon Island
 Maxwell Island
 McCoy Islands
 McLaren Island
 McQuade Island
 Methodist Island
 Mink Islands
 Minnicognashene Island
 Moon Island
 Mowat Island
 North Limestone Island
 North Watcher Island
 Northwest Burnt Island
 Nottawasaga Island
 Oak Islands
 Oak Island
 Otter Island
 Parry Island
 Pine Island
 Pittsburg Island
 Pleasant Island
 Portage Island
 Rabbit Island
 Rose Island
 Sandy Island
 Sans Souci Island
 Sharp Island
 Shawanaga Island
 Smooth Island
 Snake Islands
 South Limestone Island
 South Watcher Island
 Tanvat Island
 Thirty Thousand Islands
 Tonches Island
 Turning Island
 Umbrella Islands
 Wall Island
 Western Islands
 White Cloud Island
 Wreck Island

North Channel

 Amedroz Island
 Barren Island
 Barrie Island
 Bateman Island
 Batture Island
 Bears Back Island
 Beauty Island
 Beaver Island
 Bedford Island
 Belleau Island
 Bourinot Island
 Carpmael Island
 Crawford Island
 Crescent Island
 Darch Island
 Eastern Island
 East Rous Island
 Egg Island
 Elm Island
 Fanny Island
 Five Islands
 Galt Island
 Gertrude Islands
 Goat Island
 Gooseberry Island
 Great La Cloche Island
 Griffith Island
 Henry Island
 Heywood Island
 High Island
 Hog Island
 Little La Cloche Island
 Louisa Island
 Matheson Island
 McGregor Island
 McTavish Island
 Meredith Island
 Ned Island
 Partridge Island
 Sagamok Island
 Schreiber Island
 St. Joseph Island
 St. Just Island
 Strawberry Island
 Vidal Island
 Wabos Island
 West Mary Island
 West Rous Island

Parry Sound
 Elizabeth Island
 Huckleberry Island
 Mowat Island
 Oak Island

Hay Bay
 Clark Island

Lake Joseph
 Cameron Island
 Chief's Island
 Yoho Island
 Gitchie Island

Lake Kagawong
 Bass Island
 Gull Island
 Kakawaie Island
 Little Island

Kawagama Lake
 Dennison Island
 Big Trout Island
 Bear Island
 Echo Island
 Little Trout Island
 Trout Island

Larder Lake
 Big Pete Island
 Island U

Lower Buckhorn Lake
 Wolf Island

McArthur Lake
 McArthur Island
 Sharprock Island
 Blueberry Island
 Hidden Island
 Delta Island
 Shadfly Island
 Olyjian Isle
 Diorite Island
 Midway Island
 Crayfish Island
 Cat Island
 Maziic Island
 Taylor's Island

Lake Mindemoya
 Treasure Island

Mississippi River
 Greig Island

Moose River
 Moose Factory Island

Lake Muskoka

 Acton Island
 Browning Island
 Bigwin Island
 Crown Island
 Eilean Gowan Island
 Gairney Island
 Rankin Island
 Isle of Skye
 Taylor Island

Severn Sound

 Green Island
 Little Beausoliel Island
 Potato Island
 Present Island
 Quarry Island
 Roberts Island

Niagara River
 Cedar Island
 Gull Island
 Navy Island

Lake Nipigon
 Geike Island
 Kelvin Island
 Logan Island
 Murchison Island
 Shakespeare Island

Lake Nipissing

 Burnt Island
 Burrit Island
 East Hardwood Island
 Garden Island
 Goose Islands
 Great Manitou Island
 Gull Islands
 Iron Island
 Little Manitou Island
 Little Oak Island
 Manitou Islands
 Maskinoge Island
 Rankin Island
 Rock Islands
 Sandy Island
 Smith Island
 West Hardwood Island

Lake Ontario

 Amherst Island
 Bayfield Island
 False Duck Island
 Frontenac Islands
 Greene Island
 Gull Island
 Hickory Island
 High Bluff Island
 Horseshoe Island
 Main Duck Island
 Nicholson Island
 Scotch Bonnet Island
 Simcoe Island
 Timber Island
 Toronto Islands
 Waupoos Island
 Wolfe Island

Bay of Quinte
 Bassett Island
 Big Island
 Lyons Island
 Salmon Island

See also
 Thousand Islands

Ottawa River

 Alexandra Island
 Aylmer Island
 Basil Island
 Bate Island
 Beacon Island 
 Beckett Island
 Bell Island
 Big Island
 Big Elbow Island
 Bruyère Island
 Burnt Island
Butternut Island
 Carl Island 
 Cedar Island
 Chapman Island 
 Chartrand Island
 Chenaux Island
Christie Island 
 Clarence Island
 Coreille Island
 Corinne Island 
 Cornelius Island 
 Cotnam Island
Crab Islands 
 Cunningam Island
 Cushing Island
Daisy Island 
 Davis Island
 Deep River Islet
 Demers Island 
 Dow Island 
 Dunlop Island 
 Dupras Island
Dutch Island
 Ellis Island 
 Evelyn Island 
 Farr Island
 Fish Island
 Fraser Island 
 Fury Island 
 Gibraltar Island 
 Green Island 
Gutzman Island
 Hamilton Island
 Haycock Island
 Hazel Island 
 Hazelton Island
 Hen Island
 Hog Island
 Houston Island 
 Île Chénier
 Île du Chenail
 Île Ste-Rosalie
 Irving Island 
 Jamieson Island 
John Joe Island 
 Kate Island 
 Kedey's Island
 King Edward Island
 Latour Island 
 Lemieux Island 
 Lillian Island 
 Lorne Island
 Louise Island 
 Lower Duck Island
 Mackie Island 
 Man Island
 Meadow Island
 Merrill Island 
Metcalf Island 
 Miller Island 
 Morris Island
 Oak Island 
 O'Meara Island 
 Parker Island 
 Pearl Island 
 Petrie Island
 Pink Island 
 Poker Island 
 Princess Island
 Ramsey Island
 Randolph Island 
 Rempnouix Island 
 Riopelle Island
 Rocher Capitaine Island
 Ruby Islet 
 Sack's Island
 Sandbar Island
 Santa Island
 Sawlog Island
 Shoal Island 
 Short Turn Island 
 Steamer Island
Snake Island 
 Sullivan Island
 Upper Duck Island
 Victoria Island
 Wabewawa Island 
 Willson Island
Windsor Island

Pigeon Lake
 Big Island

Rice Lake
 Cow Island
 East Grape Island
 Grasshopper Island
 Harris Island
 Hickory Island
 Long Island
 Lower Foley Island
 Margaret Island
 Mink Island
 Muskrat island
 Paudaush Island
 Prison Island
 Rack Island
 Sugar Island
 Tic Island
 Upper Foley Island 
 West Grape island
 White Island

Rideau River
 Barnes Island
 Beech Island
 Cummings Island
 Green Island
 James Island
 Kilmarnock Island
 Libby Island
 Long Island
 Maple Island
 Nicolls Island
 Porter Island
 Sanders Island

Lake Rosseau
 Florence Island
 Tobin Island
 Wellesley Island

Lake Scugog
 Washburn Island

Lake Simcoe
 Fox Island
 Georgina Island
 Grape Island
 Snake Island
 Strawberry Island
 Thorah Island

Skootamatta Lake
 Big Island

Lake Saint Clair (North America)
 Bassett Island
 Grassy Bend Islands
 St. Anne Island
 Squirrel Island
 Walpole Island

St. Clair River
 Fawn Island
 Stag Island
 Walpole Island

Saint Lawrence River

 Burnt Island
 Pine Island

Lake of the Woods
 Aulneau Island
 Big Island
 Bigsby Island
 Copper Island
 Corkscrew Island
 Hay Island
 LaVérandrye Island
 Scotty Island
 Sultana Island
 Thompson Island
 Wolf Island
 Copeland Island
 Town Island
 Coney Island
 Treaty Island
 Shammis Island
 Crow Rock Island
 Mather Island
 Allie Island
 East Allie Island
 Big Narrows Island
 de Noyon Island
 Bishops Point Island
 Long Point Island

See also
 Islands of the Great Lakes

References

External links
 Map of Thousand Islands area
 Geographical names, Canada

 
Islands
Ontario